Ampere is the codename for a graphics processing unit (GPU) microarchitecture developed by Nvidia as the successor to both the Volta and Turing architectures. It was officially announced on May 14, 2020 and is named after French mathematician and physicist André-Marie Ampère. 

Nvidia announced the Ampere architecture GeForce 30 series consumer GPUs at a GeForce Special Event on September 1, 2020. Nvidia announced the A100 80GB GPU at SC20 on November 16, 2020. Mobile RTX graphics cards and the RTX 3060 based on the Ampere architecture were revealed on January 12, 2021. 

Nvidia announced Ampere's successor, Hopper, at GTC 2022, and "Ampere Next Next" for a 2024 release at GPU Technology Conference 2021.

Details
Architectural improvements of the Ampere architecture include the following:

 CUDA Compute Capability 8.0 for A100 and 8.6 for the GeForce 30 series
 TSMC's 7 nm FinFET process for A100
 Custom version of Samsung's 8 nm process (8N) for the GeForce 30 series
 Third-generation Tensor Cores with FP16, bfloat16, TensorFloat-32 (TF32) and FP64 support and sparsity acceleration. The individual Tensor cores have with 256 FP16 FMA operations per second 4x processing power (GA100 only, 2x on GA10x) compared to previous Tensor Core generations; the Tensor Core Count is reduced to one per SM.
 Second-generation ray tracing cores; concurrent ray tracing, shading, and compute for the GeForce 30 series
 High Bandwidth Memory 2 (HBM2) on A100 40GB & A100 80GB
 GDDR6X memory for GeForce RTX 3090, RTX 3080 Ti, RTX 3080, RTX 3070 Ti
 Double FP32 cores per SM on GA10x GPUs
 NVLink 3.0 with a 50Gbit/s per pair throughput
 PCI Express 4.0 with SR-IOV support (SR-IOV is reserved only for A100)
 Multi-instance GPU (MIG) virtualization and GPU partitioning feature in A100 supporting up to seven instances
 PureVideo feature set K hardware video decoding with AV1 hardware decoding for the GeForce 30 series and feature set J for A100
 5 NVDEC for A100
 Adds new hardware-based 5-core JPEG decode (NVJPG) with YUV420, YUV422, YUV444, YUV400, RGBA. Should not be confused with Nvidia NVJPEG (GPU-accelerated library for JPEG encoding/decoding)

Chips
 GA100
 GA102
 GA103
 GA104
 GA106
 GA107

Comparison of Compute Capability: GP100 vs GV100 vs GA100

Comparison of Precision Support Matrix  

Legend:
 FPnn: floating point with nn bits
 INTn: integer with n bits
 INT1: binary
 TF32: TensorFloat32
 BF16: bfloat16

Comparison of Decode Performance

A100 accelerator and DGX A100
The Ampere-based A100 accelerator was announced and released on May 14, 2020. The A100 features 19.5 teraflops of FP32 performance, 6912 CUDA cores, 40GB of graphics memory, and 1.6TB/s of graphics memory bandwidth. The A100 accelerator was initially available only in the 3rd generation of DGX server, including 8 A100s. Also included in the DGX A100 is 15TB of PCIe gen 4 NVMe storage, two 64-core AMD Rome 7742 CPUs, 1 TB of RAM, and Mellanox-powered HDR InfiniBand interconnect. The initial price for the DGX A100 was $199,000.

Products using Ampere
 GeForce MX series
 GeForce MX570 (mobile) (GA107)
 GeForce 20 series
 GeForce RTX 2050 (mobile) (GA107)
 GeForce 30 series
 GeForce RTX 3050 (mobile) (GA107)
 GeForce RTX 3050 (GA106 or GA107)
 GeForce RTX 3050 Ti (mobile) (GA107)
 GeForce RTX 3060 (mobile) (GA106)
 GeForce RTX 3060 (GA106 or GA104)
 GeForce RTX 3060 Ti (GA104 or GA103)
 GeForce RTX 3070 (mobile) (GA104)
 GeForce RTX 3070 (GA104)
 GeForce RTX 3070 Ti (mobile) (GA104)
 GeForce RTX 3070 Ti (GA104)
 GeForce RTX 3080 (mobile) (GA104)
 GeForce RTX 3080 (GA102)
 GeForce RTX 3080 12GB (GA102)
 GeForce RTX 3080 Ti (mobile) (GA103)
 GeForce RTX 3080 Ti (GA102)
 GeForce RTX 3090 (GA102)
 GeForce RTX 3090 Ti (GA102)
 Nvidia Workstation GPUs (formerly Quadro)
 RTX A2000 (mobile) (GA107)
 RTX A2000 (GA106)
 RTX A3000 (mobile) (GA104)
 RTX A4000 (mobile) (GA104)
 RTX A4000 (GA104)
 RTX A4500 (GA102)
 RTX A5000 (mobile) (GA104)
 RTX A5000 (GA102)
 RTX A5500 (GA102)
 RTX A6000 (GA102)
 Nvidia Data Center GPUs (formerly Tesla)
 Nvidia A2 (GA107)
 Nvidia A10 (GA102)
 Nvidia A16 (4 × GA107)
 Nvidia A30 (GA100)
 Nvidia A40 (GA102)
 Nvidia A100 (GA100)
 Nvidia A100 80GB (GA100)

See also
 List of eponyms of Nvidia GPU microarchitectures
 List of Nvidia graphics processing units
 Nvidia NVENC
 Nvidia NVDEC

References

External links
 NVIDIA A100 Tensor Core GPU Architecture whitepaper
 Nvidia Ampere GA102 GPU Architecture whitepaper
 Nvidia Ampere Architecture
 Nvidia A100 Tensor Core GPU
 NVIDIA Ampere Architecture In-Depth

Nvidia microarchitectures
Nvidia Ampere